Abdulwasea Al-Matari (born 4 July 1994) is a Yemeni footballer who plays for Al-Nahda and the Yemen national team.

Career
Al Matari made his debut for Yemen in 2013 against Bahrain during their 2015 Asian Cup qualifying group stage match, in which they lost 2–0 and failed to qualify for the tournament.

His first international goal came in Yemen's first round leg against Pakistan during 2018 World Cup qualifiers, in which Yemen ran out 3–1 winners.

International goals
Scores and results list Yemen's goal tally first.

References

External links
 

1994 births
Living people
Yemeni footballers
Yemen international footballers
Yemeni expatriate footballers
Association football midfielders
Yemeni League players
Oman Professional League players
UAE First Division League players
Al Yarmuk Al Rawda players
Al-Orouba SC players
Al-Nahda Club (Oman) players
Dibba Al-Hisn Sports Club players
Expatriate footballers in Oman
Yemeni expatriate sportspeople in Oman
Expatriate footballers in the United Arab Emirates
Yemeni expatriate sportspeople in the United Arab Emirates
People from Sanaa
2019 AFC Asian Cup players